Al Akhawayn University (Berber: Tasdawit En Wawmaten) is an independent, public, not-for-profit, coeducational university located in Ifrane, Morocco,  from the imperial city of Fez, in the Middle Atlas Mountains. The medium of instruction is the English language.

History

King Fahd of Saudi Arabia largely funded the creation of Al Akhawayn University from an endowment intended to cleanup an oil spill off the coast of Morocco. The cleanup was never realized as the wind blew the oil spill away and the endowment was used to create the university. Al Akhawayn University was founded by Royal Decree (Dahir) in 1993 and officially inaugurated by the former King Hassan II of Morocco on January 16, 1995. The Arabic name al-akhawayn, literally the "two brothers," refers to the two respective kings.

Academics
With 2,173 full-time students living and studying together on a residential campus in the Middle Atlas town of Ifrane, Al Akhawayn offers undergraduate and graduate program options in the Humanities and Social Sciences, Science and Engineering, and Business Administration – all connected by a common core based on the American liberal arts model. The university offers international and exchange programs.
Some of the notable alumni that passed through Al Akhawayn University in Ifrane include:
Zghayba
Nadia ElJacifi @nadia.eljacifi

Academic centers and institutes
 Language Center (LC)
 Leadership Development Institute
 Center for Business Ethics (CBE)
 Institute of Economic Analysis & Prospective Studies (IEAPS)
 Social Science Research Institute (SSRI)
 Executive Education Center (EEC)
 Hillary Clinton Women’s Empowerment Center (HCWEC)
 Azrou Center for Local Community Development

See also

 List of universities in Morocco
 Science and technology in Morocco

References

External links

 

 
1995 establishments in Morocco
Educational institutions established in 1995
Buildings and structures in Fès-Meknès
Liberal arts colleges
20th-century architecture in Morocco